Science of Annihilation is the fifth studio album by American heavy metal band Cage, released on May 22, 2009. This is the first Cage album to feature former Psychotic Waltz drummer Norm Leggio.

Track listing 

"The Power That Feeds" (Peck)
"Planet Crusher" (Garcia / Peck)
"Scarlet Witch" (Garcia / Peck)
"Spirit Of Vengeance" (Garcia / Peck / McGinnis)
"Black River Falls" (Garcia / Peck)
"Operation Overlord" (McGinnis / Peck)
"Power Of A God" (Garcia / Peck / McGinnis)
"Speed Kills" (Garcia / Peck)
"Stranger In Black" (Garcia / Peck)
"Die Glocke" (Garcia / Peck)
"Spectre Of War" (Garcia / Peck)
"Science Of Annihilation" (Garcia / Peck)
"At The Edge Of The Infinite" (Garcia / Peck)

Personnel 
 Sean Peck – vocals
 Dave Garcia – guitars
 Anthony Wayne McGinnis – guitars
 Mike Giordono – bass
 Norm Leggio – drums

References

2009 albums
Cage (band) albums